Marmorbyn is a locality situated in Vingåker Municipality, Södermanland County, Sweden with 382 inhabitants in 2010.

References 

Populated places in Södermanland County
Populated places in Vingåker Municipality